Stethaspis is a genus of beetles in the family Scarabaeidae, subfamily Melolonthinae.

Description 
Like other Melolonthinae, adult Stethaspis are oval and robust in shape. The antennae are relatively short and have the last few segments flattened and finger-like. The elytra leave the end of the abdomen exposed. Stethaspis are green in colour and range from 13 to 24 mm in length.

Larvae are creamy white with a prominent head, relatively large legs and a darkened posterior end (this darkening is due to the gut contents showing through the body wall). The body is curled up into a C-shape. When mature, Stethaspis larvae can be up to 45 mm long.

Ecology 
Similar to other melolonthines, Stethaspis beetles feed on plant foliage as adults and plant roots as larvae. Adults are known to damage Douglas fir.

Larvae of S. longicornis are eaten by Polynesian rats. Additionally, Stethaspis larvae are potential hosts for the introduced scoliid wasp Radumeris tasmaniensis, an ectoparasitoid of scarab larvae.

Life cycle 
Stethaspis follow the usual beetle life cycle of egg, larva, pupa and adult. The life cycle takes two years. Adults emerge en masse in summer.

Species 
Stethaspis contains the following species:

 Stethaspis convexa
 Stethaspis discoidea
 Stethaspis intermediata
 Stethaspis lineata
 Stethaspis longicornis
 Stethaspis prasinus
 Stethaspis pulchra
 Stethaspis simmondsi
 Stethaspis suturalis

Gallery

References 

Scarabaeidae genera
Melolonthinae
Insects of New Zealand